Qantas operates a fleet of Airbus A330, Airbus A380, Boeing 737 and Boeing 787 making a total of 124 aircraft. This list excludes subsidiaries Jetstar, Qantaslink and Qantas Freight.

Current fleet 
, the Qantas mainline fleet consists of the following aircraft:

, Qantas and its subsidiaries operated 297 aircraft, including 71 aircraft by Jetstar Airways; 90 by the various QantasLink-branded airlines and six by Express Freighters Australia (on behalf of Qantas Freight, which also wet leases 2 Atlas Air Boeing 747-8Fs, N850GT and N854GT).

Order history 
On 22 August 2012, Qantas announced that, due to losses and to conserve capital, it had cancelled its 35-aircraft Boeing 787-9 order while keeping the 15-aircraft 787-8 order for Jetstar Airways and moving forward 50 purchase rights. On 20 August 2015 Qantas announced that it had ordered eight Boeing 787-9s for delivery from 2017.

In February 2019, Qantas cancelled its remaining orders for a further eight Airbus A380-800 aircraft.

In June 2019, during the Paris Air Show, Qantas Group converted 26 Airbus A321neo orders to the A321XLR variant and another ten A321neo orders to the A321LR variant; and ordered an additional ten A321XLRs. This brought Qantas Group's total Airbus A320neo family order to 109 aircraft, consisting of 45 A320neos, 28 A321LRs, and 36 A321XLRs. At the time of the announcement, Qantas CEO Alan Joyce stated that a decision had not yet been made on how the aircraft would be distributed between Qantas and Jetstar Airways, or whether they were to be used for network growth or the replacement of older aircraft.

In December 2019, Qantas announced it had selected the Airbus A350-1000 for its Project Sunrise program of non-stop flights from Sydney, Melbourne and Brisbane to cities such as London, New York, Paris, Rio de Janeiro, Cape Town, and Frankfurt. No orders had been placed but Qantas would work closely with Airbus to prepare contract terms for up to 12 aircraft ahead of a final decision by the Qantas Board. Due to the impact of the COVID-19 pandemic on aviation, plans for Project Sunrise were put on hold indefinitely.

In December 2021, Qantas announced it had selected the Airbus A321XLR to replace its Boeing 737-800s, and the Airbus A220 to replace its QantasLink Boeing 717s. The in-principle agreement was for up to 134 orders and purchase right options over 10 plus years with deliveries occurring sometime after 1 July 2023. The order was expected to be finalised before 30 June 2022.

In May 2022, Qantas announced it had placed an order for 12 Airbus A350-1000 for the Project Sunrise program. The first of these is expected to be delivered to Qantas in late 2025. To celebrate this order, an Airbus A350-1000 was flown to Sydney from Toulouse via Perth wearing Qantas decals. The 238 seats will be split into 6 first class suites (three-abreast), 52 business class suites (four-abreast), 40 premium economy seats at 40″ pitch (eight-abreast) and 140 economy class seats at 33″ pitch (nine-abreast). In the same announcement, they also finalised their order for the Airbus A321XLR and Airbus A220.

In February 2023, Qantas announced it was exercising 9 purchase right options for the A220-300 aircraft, taking the total number of A220-300s on firm order to 29.

Fleet history 

Qantas has had a varied fleet since the airline's inception. Following its foundation shortly after the end of the First World War, the first aircraft to serve in the fleet was the Avro 504K, a small biplane. Starting with a delivery of seven Boeing 707 aircraft, the airline's fleet entered the jet age in 1959.

First aircraft 

Qantas' first aircraft was an Avro 504K (a replica of which can be seen at Sydney Airport's Qantas Domestic Terminal 3 on departures level) with a 100-horsepower (74 kW) water-cooled Sunbeam Dyak engine. By 1921 it also operated a Royal Aircraft Factory BE2E with a 90-horsepower (67 kW) air-cooled engine.

Qantas inaugurated its three-day-long Short Empire Flying Boat service between Rose Bay and Singapore-Kallang Airport in the late 1930s. The run had stopovers in Townsville, Darwin and Surabaya. The service was replaced in 1943 by a long-range service, the Catalina flying boat.

World War II 
During World War II, Qantas operated flying boats on the Australia-England route in cooperation with British Overseas Airways Corporation (BOAC). After Italy entered the war in June 1940, this became the Horseshoe Route between Sydney and Durban in South Africa with the South Africa – UK stage being by sea. This service was a vital line of communication between Australia and the United Kingdom.

In June 1943 Qantas employed 5 Consolidated PBY Catalina flying boats—obtained under Lend-Lease through the British Air Ministry—to establish a route between Perth in Australia and Colombo in Sri Lanka (then Ceylon) over the Indian Ocean. Becoming known as The Double Sunrise, this route remains the longest non-stop commercial flight ever undertaken, requiring between 27 and 32 hours to complete (depending on winds). Over the next two years, 271 crossings took place.

Starting in June 1944, Qantas augmented the Catalinas with the first of two converted Consolidated Liberator bombers, which could complete the Australia–Ceylon journey in substantially less time with a much larger payload. The route was named Kangaroo Route and marked the first time that Qantas' now-famous kangaroo logo was used; passengers received a certificate proclaiming them as members of The Order of the Longest Hop. A new version of the logo was launched in July 2007.

In June 1945, Avro Lancastrians were introduced on the Australia–England service, with the Liberators and Catalinas being shifted to other routes.

Post War era 

In accordance with the Lend-Lease agreement, the five modified Catalinas used for Double Sunrise service were scuttled after the war. However, Qantas obtained seven former Royal Australian Air Force Catalinas, using them to serve outlying South Pacific islands. The last two Catalinas were retired in 1958.

After World War II Qantas modernised its fleet with Lockheed Constellation aircraft, commencing with six L-749 Constellations from 1947.

In 1949, Douglas DC-4 Skymasters were obtained, replacing Lancastrians on some routes.

In 1950, Qantas introduced the first of five Short Sandringham flying boats which flew from the Rose Bay flying boat base on Sydney Harbour to destinations in New Caledonia, New Hebrides, Fiji, New Guinea and Lord Howe Island. Two of these were purchased from TEAL and the other three were purchased from BOAC. These were in service through to 1955.

From 1954, Qantas placed into service the first of sixteen L-1049 Super Constellation aircraft, which would remain in the fleet through to 1963. By 1956 the airline was operating 34 propeller-driven aircraft. Qantas carried a record number of passengers to the 1956 Summer Olympics in Melbourne, and also carried the Olympic flame into the Southern Hemisphere for the first time on its longest ever trip, from Athens to Darwin.

Jet Age 

Qantas entered the Jet Age in July 1959 with Boeing 707 services to the United States. The service was extended to London via New York. Sydney to London services via Bombay began in October 1959. With the certification of the turbofan engine, Qantas modified its existing 707-138 fleet with the turbofans, naming its Boeing 707 aircraft V-Jets, from the Latin vannus, meaning "fan" as commonly accepted, but really standing for "thing that blows against the grain". In total, Qantas took delivery of seven Boeing 707-138s, and a further six 707-138Bs.

From 7 November 1959 until 30 May 1963, Qantas operated six de Havilland Comets, four being wet leased from BOAC. They were crewed by BOAC employees and featured Qantas titles on the fuselage in place of the BOAC titles.

Following this, Qantas placed in service twenty-two Boeing 707-338Cs, which replaced the Boeing 707-138Bs and provided for expansion of the fleet. These entered service in February 1965 and flew through until retirement in March 1979.

From 1971, Qantas operated the Boeing 747-238B, which strengthened its long haul fleet. When the Boeing 707s were retired in 1979, Qantas became the world's only all Boeing 747 operator. In 1981, two short body Boeing 747SPs entered the fleet for flights to Wellington, and they were subsequently used on non-stop flights between Sydney and Los Angeles.

In November 1984, Qantas commenced service with six Boeing 747-338s with an extended upper deck. From 1985, Qantas ceased being an all Boeing 747 operator when the first of seven Boeing 767-238ERs entered the fleet. On its delivery flight in July 1989, Qantas' first Boeing 747-400 flew a record-breaking non-stop flight from London to Sydney in little more than 20 hours that stood until bettered by a Boeing 787 in October 2019. Qantas purchased a total of 60 Boeing 747s with the last delivered in 2003. Fifty-seven were purchased new and three second-hand, it operated a further five leased from other airlines at various stages. The last six Boeing 747-400s were retired in 2020.

In the early 1990s Qantas was one of eight major airlines working with Boeing on the design of the Boeing 777. Despite being part of the design group, Qantas ultimately never acquired any 777s. Several aviation commentators have criticised this decision, as the 777 appears to be a good fit for Qantas' requirements. While the reasons have never been made public by Qantas, it is believed that various reasons contributed to the decision, such as a Civil Aviation Safety Authority restriction on ETOPS180 operations, errors made by Qantas in the forecasting of future fuel prices which made the 777 appear expensive to operate, and a desire to keep the number of types in the fleet to a minimum.

In 2008, Qantas took delivery of the first of 12 Airbus A380s.

1970 fleet

Recent retirements 

Qantas operated Airbus A300B4 aircraft after its acquisition of Australian Airlines. The airline also operated Boeing 737-300, Boeing 747-200, Boeing 747SP, Boeing 747-300 and Boeing 767-200ER aircraft.

In 2014, Qantas retired its fleet of Boeing 737-400 aircraft, after the last scheduled service of the type on 23 February.

Throughout 2014, Qantas's Boeing 767-300ER fleet was in the process of a phase-out with the last five operating commercial services operating on 27 December. Four of them were sold to WestJet.

On 13 October 2019, Qantas' final Boeing 747-400 (VH-OJU, Lord Howe Island) was retired after operating QF99 from Sydney to Los Angeles. On 28 March 2020, Qantas operated its last commercial Boeing 747 flight from Santiago de Chile to Sydney.

The final Boeing 747-400ER in the fleet (VH-OEJ, Wunala) departed Sydney on 22 July 2020 as flight number QF7474 doing a flypast of Sydney Harbour, Sydney CBD and the northern and eastern suburbs beaches followed by a low level overfly of Shellharbour Airport in a final farewell to VH-OJA. Seats on three joy flights – over Sydney, Brisbane and Canberra – were offered before the aircraft's final flight. In the context of the COVID-19 pandemic's impact on Victoria, Melbourne was not offered a flight. The final flight departed from Sydney, while the aircraft was sprayed with jets of water and crowds looked on. Its flight path traced Qantas's 'Flying Kangaroo' logo in the sky as it headed east, and  entered retirement in the Californian desert in Mojave.

References

External links 
 

Qantas
Lists of aircraft by operator
fleet